Óscar Armando Bonilla Fúnez (born 11 June 1978 in San Pedro Sula, Honduras) is a Honduran footballer who currently plays as a defender or midfielder for the Liga Nacional de Honduras club Marathón.

Club career
Nicknamed El Pescado, Bonilla began his football career at Platense in Puerto Cortés. His performance helped him to become hired by the Uruguayan club Bella Vista in 2001. One year later, he made his way back to Honduras.

The professional Honduran football club Olimpia acquired him in the year 2002. After playing 5 years for Olimpia, he passed to Marathón in 2006–07 Clausura. Bonilla was able to win two championships with Marathón. In 2009, he was transferred to Real España, in an exchange with Mario Rodríguez.

In the following years, Óscar Bonilla played for Victoria (2010), Olimpia (2012), Real Sociedad (2012) and Parrillas One (2013).

In December 2013 he returned to Marathón.

International career
Bonilla participated with the Honduras national football team, earning 8 caps and scoring no goals. Bonilla was in the 2003 CONCACAF Gold Cup, as well in the UNCAF Nations Cup 2003.

References

1978 births
Living people
Honduran footballers
Parrillas One players
C.D. Marathón players
C.D. Real Sociedad players
Association football defenders